Maksim Stanislavovich Sidorov (born 18 March 1998) is a Russian football player. He plays for FC Kuban Krasnodar.

Club career
He made his debut in the Russian Professional Football League for FC Kuban-2 Krasnodar on 28 July 2016 in a game against FC Spartak Vladikavkaz.

He made his debut for the main squad of FC Kuban Krasnodar on 24 August 2016 in a Russian Cup game against FC Energomash Belgorod. He made his Russian Football National League debut for Kuban on 9 August 2017 in a game against FC Sibir Novosibirsk.

References

External links
 
 Profile by Russian Professional Football League

1998 births
Living people
Russian footballers
Association football defenders
Association football midfielders
FC Kuban Krasnodar players
FC Urozhay Krasnodar players
FC Olimp-Dolgoprudny players
Russian First League players
Russian Second League players